Still Around may refer to:
 "Still Around", a song by Paloma Faith from the 2017 album The Architect
 "Still Around" (3OH!3 song), from the 2008 album Want
 "Still Around", a song by Pieta Brown from the 2005 album In the Cool